The Big Day is a 1960 black and white British drama film directed by Peter Graham Scott and starring Donald Pleasence, Andrée Melly and Colin Gordon. The big day approaches when a business boss must choose between three prospective candidates for a job.

Plot

Married 42 year old Victor Partridge is having an assignation with Nina, his 19 year old secretary.  He discusses his desire for promotion.

In the pub Harry Jackson discusses his wife's relationship to his boss, and also seeks promotion.

At interview, Partridge, Jackson and Selkirk all vie for the sole position. The boss Mr Baker has to choose.

Partridge, despite looking very mild-mannered, has a wife as well as a girlfriend! He is the company accountant, but the affair is leaked to the boss to ruin his chances of promotion. Jackson (who is Transport Manager) has been filing fake driver records and this is exposed to also ruin his hopes.

Selkirk, the Sales Manager, seems the likely choice for the directorship in these circumstances. However, Baker calls him in to explain why he is not gettin the post... he is too ruthless.

Surprisingly Partridge is given the job... Baker explains he is reliably dull, but insists that his secretary must go.

Partridge in the new job finds it is a poisoned chalice, as he must work much harder for little more than his name on the company notepaper.

Cast
 Donald Pleasence as Victor Partridge  
 Andrée Melly as Nina Wentworth  
 Colin Gordon as George Baker  
 Harry H. Corbett as Harry Jackson  
 William Franklyn as Mr. T. Selkirk  
 Susan Shaw as Phyllis Selkirk  
 Molly Urquhart as Mrs. Deeping - Baker's secretary  
 Betty Marsden as Mabel Jackson 
 Freda Bamford as Betty Partridge
 Marianne Stone as Madge Delaney, Selkirk's secretary 
 Roddy McMillan as Bob  
 Timothy Bateson as Clerk  
 Anthony Bate as Driver  
 Sabina Franklyn as baby (uncredited) - (daughter of William Franklyn)
 Derek Briggs as Mechanic

References

Bibliography
 Chibnall, Steve & McFarlane, Brian. The British 'B' Film. Palgrave MacMillan, 2009.

External links

1960 films
1960 drama films
1960s business films
British drama films
British black-and-white films
Films directed by Peter Graham Scott
Films scored by Clifton Parker
1960s English-language films
1960s British films